The 1996 ABN AMRO World Tennis Tournament was a men's tennis tournament played on indoor carpet courts at Rotterdam Ahoy in the Netherlands. It was part of the World Series of the 1996 ATP Tour. The tournament ran from 4 March 4 through 10 March 1996. Goran Ivanišević won the singles title.

The singles draw featured world No. 1, reigning Wimbledon and US Open champion and recent San Jose and Memphis titlist Pete Sampras, Zagreb, Dubai and Milan winner Goran Ivanišević and Australian Open quarterfinalist and Adelaide champion Yevgeny Kafelnikov. Also competing were Milan runner-up Marc Rosset, 1995 Stockholm finalist Arnaud Boetsch, Richard Krajicek, Jan Siemerink and Bohdan Ulihrach.

Finals

Men's singles

 Goran Ivanišević defeated  Yevgeny Kafelnikov 6–4, 3–6, 6–3
 It was Ivanisevic's 5th title of the year and the 23rd of his career.

Men's doubles

 David Adams /  Marius Barnard defeated  Hendrik Jan Davids /  Cyril Suk 6–3, 5–7, 7–6
 It was Adams' only title of the year and the 9th of his career. It was Barnard's 1st title of the year and the 3rd of his career.

References

External links
 Official website 
 Official website 
 ATP tournament profile
 ITF tournament edition details

 
ABN AMRO World Tennis Tournament
ABN AMRO World Tennis Tournament
ABN AMRO World Tennis Tournament